Montopoli may refer to two Italian municipalities:

Montopoli di Sabina, in the Province of Rieti, Lazio
Montopoli in Val d'Arno, in the Province of Pisa, Tuscany